Juan Carlos Alemán Soto (born 23 March 1966) was Guatemala's Minister of National Defense.

References

Living people
1966 births
Defense Ministers of Guatemala